Marmot Pass, at -high, provides a trail corridor through the Buckhorn Wilderness in the Olympic Mountains of Washington state.  The pass is situated near Buckhorn Mountain (6,870 feet), Iron Mountain (6,804 feet), and Boulder Ridge (6,852 feet). From Marmot Pass, one can see the tallest peaks in the mountain range, and look down at the Dungeness Valley, and Hood Canal.  And it's been said Seattle fireworks are visible from the pass on the 4th of July.

The trail route to the pass is a  trip for hikers, beginning at the rolling Big Quilcene River.

Venturing above the pass onto a ridge leading to Buckhorn Mountain, one can get views beyond the Olympic Mountains, including Mount Baker, Glacier Peak, Mount St. Helens, and Mount Adams.

Landforms of Jefferson County, Washington
Olympic Mountains
Mountain passes of Washington (state)
Transportation in Jefferson County, Washington